Walthall is a surname of English extraction. Notable people with the surname include:

Edward C. Walthall (1831–1898), American Confederate general and politician
Henry B. Walthall (1878–1936), American actor
Madison Walthall (1792–1848), American politician

See also
Walthall (disambiguation)

References